Colonel Alexander Heinrich Gebhard von Zastrow (20 August 1768 in Kolpin – 23 June 1815 in Namur) was a Prussian officer during the Napoleonic Wars.

Biography
Von Zastrow was mortally wounded during the storming of Namure on 20 June 1815 leading the Prussian 6th Brigade in an attack on the French rearguard.

Family
Von Zastrow was married to Mathilde von Blankenstein (1777–1868). They had a notable son:
 Heinrich (1801–1875) who became a Prussian general and served in the Austro-Prussian War and the Franco-German War

Notes

References
 
 

1768 births
1815 deaths
Prussian Army personnel of the Napoleonic Wars
Military personnel killed in the Napoleonic Wars